The 2021 UConn Huskies football team represented the University of Connecticut (UConn) in the 2021 NCAA Division I FBS football season. The Huskies competed as an independent, having left the American Athletic Conference following the 2019 season. They played their home games at Rentschler Field in East Hartford, Connecticut.

On September 5, following the team's 38–28 loss to FCS-school Holy Cross, head coach Randy Edsall announced he would be retiring at the end of the season. The following day, the school announced that Edsall had resigned effective immediately and defensive coordinator Lou Spanos was named the interim head coach.

On November 11, former UCLA coach Jim L. Mora was named the school's 31st head coach beginning with the 2022 season. Shortly after the hire he helped serve as an offensive assistant for the remainder of the season.

The team finished the season 1–11.

Previous season

The Huskies finished the 2019 season 2–10, 0–8 in American Athletic Conference (AAC) play, to finish in last place in the East Division. The 2019 season was the Huskies' last as a member of the AAC. The Huskies did not compete in the 2020 season due to the COVID-19 pandemic.

Departure from the American
In June 2020, it was announced that UConn's other sports programs would be joining the Big East Conference. Since the Big East does not sponsor football and the American did not want to keep UConn as a football-only school, it was decided that the football program would compete as an FBS Independent. The move to the Big East was primarily due to the university wanting to focus more on the men's and women's basketball programs, feeling the move to the American had hindered those programs.

Schedule

Source

Roster

Game summaries

at Fresno State

Holy Cross

Purdue

at Army

Wyoming

at Vanderbilt

at UMass

The day before the game, interim head coach Lou Spanos, offensive coordinator/offensive line coach Frank Giufre, and tight ends coach Corey Edsall, along with offensive linemen Ryan Van Demark and Will Meyer, tested positive for COVID-19. Defensive line coach Dennis Dottin-Carter served as the Huskies' head coach for the game.

Yale

Middle Tennessee

at Clemson

at UCF

No. 24 Houston

References

UConn
UConn Huskies football seasons
UConn Huskies football